Bobby Jackson (born March 13, 1973) is an American professional basketball coach and former player. He serves as the head coach of the Stockton Kings in the NBA G League, the development affiliate of the Sacramento Kings of the National Basketball Association (NBA).

Basketball career
Jackson graduated from Salisbury High School in 1992. He attended Western Nebraska Community College and the University of Minnesota before being selected by the Seattle SuperSonics with the 23rd pick in the 1997 NBA draft. As a Golden Gopher, Bobby Jackson led Minnesota to the Final Four, where they lost to the Kentucky Wildcats.  He was traded to the Denver Nuggets prior to his rookie season where he played 68 games before moving on to a more familiar place in Minnesota where he donned a Timberwolves jersey for two seasons.

He is perhaps best known for his years in Sacramento when he played for the Kings from 2000 to 2005, where he was known as "Action Jackson" and was a crowd favorite. In the 2002 NBA Playoffs, after he and his team finished with a 61-21 regular season record, Jackson and the Kings came within one game of making the NBA Finals, eliminated controversially by the Los Angeles Lakers. During the 2002-03 NBA season, Jackson averaged a career-best 15.2 points per game on the way to being named the Sixth Man of the Year. Jackson suffered an abdominal strain early in the 2004–05 season that forced him to miss 51 games. The following season, he was traded to the Memphis Grizzlies for Bonzi Wells.

On July 29, 2008, it was reported that Jackson would be traded by the Rockets back to the Sacramento Kings along with Donté Greene, a 2009 first round draft pick and cash consideration in exchange for Ron Artest (now Metta World Peace). The trade was completed on August 14, due to Greene's rookie contract signing on July 14.

Jackson retired on October 24, 2009.  He later became an assistant coach for the Sacramento Kings. On June 5, 2013, new Kings coach Michael Malone announced that the 2012–13 assistant coaches would not be retained for the 2013–14 season.

On September 9, 2013, Jackson was hired by the Minnesota Timberwolves as a player development coach.

In 2021, Jackson was named the head coach of the Stockton Kings in the NBA G League.

NBA career statistics

Regular season 

|-
| style="text-align:left;"| 1997–98
| style="text-align:left;"| Denver
| 68 || 53 || 30.0 || .392 || .259 || .814 || 4.4 || 4.7 || 1.5 || .2 || 11.6
|-
| style="text-align:left;"| 1998–99
| style="text-align:left;"| Minnesota
| 50 || 12 || 18.8 || .405 || .370 || .772 || 2.7 || 3.3 || .8 || .1 || 7.1
|-
| style="text-align:left;"| 1999–00
| style="text-align:left;"| Minnesota
| 73 || 10 || 14.2 || .405 || .283 || .776 || 2.1 || 2.4 || .7 || .1 || 5.1
|-
| style="text-align:left;"| 2000–01
| style="text-align:left;"| Sacramento
| 79 || 7 || 20.9 || .439 || .375 || .739 || 3.1 || 2.0 || 1.1 || .1 || 7.2
|-
| style="text-align:left;"| 2001–02
| style="text-align:left;"| Sacramento
| 81 || 3 || 21.6 || .443 || .361 || .810 || 3.1 || 2.0 || .9 || .1 || 11.1
|-
| style="text-align:left;"| 2002–03
| style="text-align:left;"| Sacramento
| 59 || 26 || 28.4 || .464 || .379 || .846 || 3.7 || 3.1 || 1.2 || .1 || 15.2
|-
| style="text-align:left;"| 2003–04
| style="text-align:left;"| Sacramento
| 50 || 0 || 23.7 || .444 || .370 || .752 || 3.5 || 2.1 || 1.0 || .2 || 13.8
|-
| style="text-align:left;"| 2004–05
| style="text-align:left;"| Sacramento
| 25 || 0 || 21.4 || .427 || .344 || .862 || 3.4 || 2.4 || .6 || .1 || 12.0
|-
| style="text-align:left;"| 2005–06
| style="text-align:left;"| Memphis
| 71 || 15 || 25.0 || .382 || .389 || .733 || 3.1 || 2.7 || .9 || .0 || 11.4
|-
| style="text-align:left;"| 2006–07
| style="text-align:left;"| NO/Oklahoma City
| 56 || 2 || 23.8 || .394 || .327 || .774 || 3.2 || 2.5 || .9 || .1 || 10.6
|-
| style="text-align:left;"| 2007–08
| style="text-align:left;"| New Orleans
| 46 || 0 || 19.4 || .392 || .368 || .816 || 2.4 || 1.7 || .7 || .1 || 7.1
|-
| style="text-align:left;"| 2007–08
| style="text-align:left;"| Houston
| 26 || 5 || 19.2 || .419 || .341 || .750 || 2.7 || 2.4 || .5 || .1 || 8.8
|-
| style="text-align:left;"| 2008–09
| style="text-align:left;"| Sacramento
| 71 || 10 || 20.9 || .398 || .305 || .851 || 2.8 || 2.0 || .9 || .1 || 7.5
|- class="sortbottom"
| style="text-align:center;" colspan="2"| Career
| 755 || 143 || 22.2 || .417 || .354 || .793 || 3.1 || 2.6 || .9 || .0 || 9.7

Playoffs 

|-
| style="text-align:left;"| 1999
| style="text-align:left;"| Minnesota
| 4 || 0 || 6.8 || .200 || .000 || .000 || 1.0 || .5 || .0 || .0 || 1.0
|-
| style="text-align:left;"| 2000
| style="text-align:left;"| Minnesota
| 3 || 0 || 10.0 || .500 || .333 || 1.000 || 1.7 || 1.3 || .7 || .3 || 5.0
|-
| style="text-align:left;"| 2001
| style="text-align:left;"| Sacramento
| 8 || 0 || 22.8 || .438 || .286 || .714 || 3.3 || 2.3 || 1.0 || .0 || 7.0
|-
| style="text-align:left;"| 2002
| style="text-align:left;"| Sacramento
| 16 || 1 || 23.4 || .445 || .256 || .791 || 3.3 || 2.0 || .9 || .2 || 10.9
|-
| style="text-align:left;"| 2003
| style="text-align:left;"| Sacramento
| 12 || 0 || 27.6 || .457 || .349 || .886 || 4.5 || 3.3 || 1.0 || .1 || 14.3
|-
| style="text-align:left;"| 2005
| style="text-align:left;"| Sacramento
| 5 || 0 || 15.8 || .270 || .167 || 1.000 || 1.2 || 1.8 || .2 || .2 || 5.2
|-
| style="text-align:left;"| 2006
| style="text-align:left;"| Memphis
| 4 || 0 || 25.0 || .414 || .364 || .714 || 2.0 || 1.3 || .3 || .0 || 8.3
|-
| style="text-align:left;"| 2008
| style="text-align:left;"| Houston
| 6 || 2 || 23.0 || .286 || .208 || .636 || 1.7 || 1.5 || .8 || .0 || 8.7
|- class="sortbottom"
| style="text-align:center;" colspan="2"| Career 
| 58 || 3 || 21.7 || .405 || .270 || .807 || 2.8 || 2.1 || .7 || .1 || 9.2

Notes

References

External links
NBA biography of Jackson
Minnesota Golden Gophers bio of Jackson
ClutchFans.net Bobby Jackson Profile

1973 births
Living people
20th-century African-American sportspeople
21st-century African-American sportspeople
African-American basketball players
All-American college men's basketball players
American basketball scouts
American men's basketball players
Basketball coaches from North Carolina
Basketball players from North Carolina
Denver Nuggets players
Houston Rockets players
Memphis Grizzlies players
Minnesota Golden Gophers men's basketball players
Minnesota Timberwolves players
New Orleans Hornets players
People from East Spencer, North Carolina
Point guards
Sacramento Kings players
Sacramento Kings scouts
Salisbury High School (North Carolina) alumni
Seattle SuperSonics draft picks
Stockton Kings coaches
Western Nebraska Cougars men's basketball players